Perri O'Shaughnessy is the pen name of the authors Mary and Pamela O'Shaughnessy, sisters who live in Northern California. Pamela, a Harvard Law School graduate, was a trial lawyer for sixteen years. Mary is a former editor and writer for multimedia projects. Their novels have been translated into many languages including Dutch, German, Bulgarian, French, Spanish, and Japanese.  Several have been New York Times bestsellers.

Published books
Nina Reilly novels
Motion to Suppress, 1995
Invasion of Privacy, 1996
Obstruction of Justice, 1997
Breach of Promise, 1998
Acts of Malice, 1999
Move to Strike, 2000
Writ of Execution, 2001
Unfit to Practice, 2002
Presumption of Death, 2003
Unlucky in Law, 2004
Case of Lies, 2005
Show No Fear, 2008
Dreams of the Dead, 2011

Other 
Sinister Shorts, 2006, collection of short stories
Keeper of the Keys, 2007, novel

References

External links
 
  
 Interview with Perri O'Shaughnessy - Readers Read
 Author Perri O'Shaughnessy Biography and Book List - Fresh Fiction
 Perri O'Shaughnessy - Move to Strike Book Review - BookPage
 AudioFile Magazine Spotlight on Author Perri O'Shaughnessy
 Book Review: Dreams of the Dead by Perri O'Shaughnessy - TracyReaderDad Book Reviews

American crime writers
Sibling duos
Collective pseudonyms

Living people
Women mystery writers
Year of birth missing (living people)
Pseudonymous women writers
20th-century pseudonymous writers
21st-century pseudonymous writers